A Glass of Water (German: Ein Glas Wasser) is a 1923 German silent historical drama film directed by Ludwig Berger and starring Mady Christians, Lucie Höflich and Hans Brausewetter. It premiered at the UFA-Palast am Zoo on 1 February 1923. It was based on a play of the same title by Eugène Scribe, set in England during the reign of Queen Anne. The film was very well received both commercially and critically on its release. It is considered one of the milestones of Weimar cinema.

The film's sets were designed by the art director Rudolf Bamberger. It was made at the Babelsberg Studios in Berlin with location shooting in Bayreuth.

Cast
Mady Christians as Queen Anne
Lucie Höflich as the Duchess of Marlborough
Hans Brausewetter as John William Masham (a fictionalised version of Samuel Masham)
Rudolf Rittner as Lord Henry Bolingbroke (a fictionalised version of Henry St John, 1st Viscount Bolingbroke)
Helga Thomas as Abigail
Hugo Döblin as Tomwood the jeweller
Hans Wassmann as Lord Richard Scott
Bruno Decarli as Marquis Torcy
Max Gülstorff as Thompson
Franz Jackson as Hassan
Henry Stuart
Joseph Römer  
Gertrud Wolle

See also
A Glass of Water (1960)

References

External links

Films of the Weimar Republic
German silent feature films
Films based on works by Eugène Scribe
Films directed by Ludwig Berger
Films set in England
Films set in London
Films set in the 1700s
German films based on plays
Cultural depictions of Anne, Queen of Great Britain
German historical films
1920s historical films
Films produced by Erich Pommer
German black-and-white films
Films shot at Babelsberg Studios
UFA GmbH films
1920s German films